The Pathanamthitta district has four types of administrative hierarchies: 
 Taluk and Village administration managed by the provincial government of Kerala
 Panchayath Administration managed by the local bodies
 Parliament Constituencies for the federal government of India
 Assembly Constituencies for the provincial government of Kerala

Electoral Administration 
As per the Delimitation of Parliamentary and Assembly Constituencies Order, 2008, Pathanamthitta has five Assembly constituencies, down from eight. However, the district was unified into a single Parliamentary constituency, thus contributing a seat to the Lok Sabha. The Pathanamthitta parliamentary constituency is formed by including all the five Assembly constituencies of the district along with two other Assembly constituencies in the neighboring Kottayam district. Congress, BJP, Kerala Congress, and the CPM/CPI are the main political parties.

Revenue Administration 
The district headquarters is at Pathanamthitta town. The district administration is headed by the District Collector. He is assisted by five Deputy Collectors holding charges of general matters, revenue recovery, land acquisition, land reforms and election.

Pathanamthitta district is divided into two revenue divisions and six taluks.

The taluks again are divided into villages. Villages are the lowest level of subdivisions in India. Pathanamthitta has a total of 70 villages.

Adoor Revenue Division: 
 Adoor Taluk
 Konni Taluk
 Kozhencherry Taluk

Thiruvalla Revenue Division: 
 Ranni Taluk
 Mallapally Taluk
 Thiruvalla Taluk

Adoor Taluk 
Headquarters: Adoor. No. Of Villages: 14.

Villages: Enadimangalam, Kodumon, Angadickal, Ezhamkulam, Enathu, Erathu, Adoor, Peringanad, Pallikkal, Kadampanad, Pandalam Thekkekara, Thumpamon, Kurampala, Pandalam

Konni Taluk 
Headquarters: Konni. No. Of Villages: 14.

Villages: Kalanjoor, Koodal, Mylapra, Malayalapuzha, Vallicode, Vallicode-Kottayam, Pramadom, Konni, Konni-Thazham, Iravon, Aruvappulam, Thannithodu, Seethathodu, Chittar

Kozhencherry Taluk 
Headquarters: Pathanamthitta. No. Of Villages: 11

Villages: Kulanada, Mezhuveli, Kidangannoor, Aranmula, Mallappuzhassery, Kozhencherry, Naranganam, Elanthoor, Chenneerkara, Omalloor, Pathanamthitta

Ranni Taluk 
Headquarters: Ranni. No. Of Villages: 10

Villages: Vadasserikkara, Ranni-Perunad, Athikkayam, Kollamula, Chethakkal, Ranni-Pazhavangadi, Ranni-Angadi, Ranni, Cherukole, Ayroor

Mallapally Taluk 
Headquarters: Mallapally. No. Of Villages: 9

Villages: Kottangal, Perumpetty, Ezhumattoor, Thelliyoor, Puramattam, Anicadu, Kallooppara, Mallappally, Kunnamthanam

Thiruvalla Taluk 
Headquarters: Thiruvalla. No. Of Villages: 12

Villages: Kaviyoor, Kuttoor, Eraviperoor, Koipuram, Thottapuzhassery, Kuttappuzha, Thiruvalla, Kavumbhagam, Peringara, Nedumpuram, Kadapra, Niranam

Civic Administration 
Under the three tier system of panchayat in rural areas, Pathanamthitta has one district panchayat, 9 block panchayat and 57 grama panchayats.

Under the single tier system in urban areas, there are 4 municipalities the district. In addition, there is a census town (Kozhencherry).

Municipalities
 Thiruvalla
 Pathanamthitta
 Adoor
 Pandalam

References

Politics of Pathanamthitta district